Messalina (minor planet designation: 545 Messalina) is a minor planet orbiting the Sun. It was discovered on 3 October 1904 by Paul Götz (provisional name 1904 OY), at Heidelberg.  It is named after Valeria Messalina, the third wife of Roman Emperor Claudius.

References

External links
 
 

Background asteroids
Messalina
Messalina
CD-type asteroids (Tholen)
Cb-type asteroids (SMASS)
19041003